Thomas Strüngmann (born 1950) founded generic drug maker Hexal AG ($1.6 billion sales during 2004) in 1986. In 2005, he and his brother Andreas sold Hexal for $6.7B. They earned $8B on their stake in BioNTech SE, the German company developing the Pfizer–BioNTech COVID-19 vaccine. They own approximately 50% of the company as well as significant ownership in 4SC and Immatics. He currently has the largest health-care earned fortune with his brother. 

The brothers operate out of a family office, Athos Service.

See also
List of billionaires

References

External links
Forbes World's Richest People

1950 births
Living people
German billionaires
20th-century German businesspeople
21st-century German businesspeople